Jubilee is a 1978 cult film directed by Derek Jarman. It stars Jenny Runacre, Ian Charleson and a host of punk rockers. The title refers to the Silver Jubilee of Elizabeth II in 1977.

Numerous punk icons appear in the film including Adam Ant, Toyah, Jordan (a Malcolm McLaren protégé), Nell Campbell, Hermine Demoriane and Jayne County. It features performances by Jayne County and Adam and the Ants. There are also cameo appearances by the Slits and Siouxsie and the Banshees. The film was scored by Brian Eno.

Plot
Queen Elizabeth I is transported forward in time to the film's present day by the occultist John Dee, who commands the spirit guide Ariel (a character from William Shakespeare's The Tempest) to bring them there. Elizabeth arrives in the shattered Britain of the 1970s and moves through the social and physical decay of the city, observing the sporadic activities of a group of aimless nihilists - mostly young women, including Amyl Nitrate, Bod, Chaos, Crabs and Mad.

An early scene, set in a squat, introduces the audience to this group of characters and also to Sphinx and Angel, two incestuous bisexual brothers. Amyl Nitrate instructs a group of young women about history — in so doing, valorising the violent criminal activity of Myra Hindley — before reminiscing about her time as a ballet dancer. Bod, a sex-hating anarchist, has just strangled and killed Queen Elizabeth II, stealing her crown in an arbitrary street robbery.

From there the group move on to a café, where Crabs picks up a young musician called simply Kid, Mad tears up some postcards, and Bod attacks a waitress with a bottle of ketchup. Bod contacts impresario Borgia Ginz. On meeting Ginz, however, she is surprised to find Amyl performing a pastiche of "Rule Britannia". Sphinx and Angel establish a relationship with Viv, a young former artist, whom they take to meet Max, an ex-soldier. In exchange for sexual favours, Crabs takes Kid to see Ginz, who auditions Kid's band and signs them up under the name "Scum". Sphinx and Angel try to talk Kid out of this, but he just laughs at their lecturing. Ginz is branching out into property management and has purchased "abandoned" properties such as Westminster Cathedral and Buckingham Palace, which are transformed into musical venues.

Meanwhile, Mad, Bod and Crabs asphyxiate Happy Days, one of Crabs' one-night stands, with red plastic sheeting. They proceed to break into the flat of androgynous rock star Lounge Lizard, whom Bod throttles to death. A fight breaks out between Kid and a policeman, at a disco session in Westminster Cathedral. After the gang all watch Kid's TV debut together, Viv and the three males pay a visit to Max's bingo hall, where violent police activity causes the death of Sphinx, Angel and the Kid. Revenge attacks on the two police officers responsible follow. One of them is castrated to death by Mad and Amyl; the other, who has just started an affair with Crabs, is blown up on his doorstep with a petrol bomb by Bod.

Finally, Ginz takes the four women off to Dorset — "the only safe place to live these days" — an unreconstructed right wing aristocratic enclave, where he signs a recording contract with the gang. Interspersed with these displays of contemporary anarchic violence, Dee, Ariel and Elizabeth try to interpret the signs of anarchic modernity around them, before they undertake a pastoral and nostalgic return to the sixteenth century at the film's end.

Cast
 Jenny Runacre – Queen Elizabeth I / Bod
 Little Nell – Crabs 
 Toyah Willcox – Mad
 Jordan – Amyl Nitrate
 Hermine Demoriane – Chaos
 Ian Charleson – Angel
 Karl Johnson – Sphinx
 Linda Spurrier – Viv
 Orlando – Borgia Ginz 
 Jayne County – Lounge Lizard 
 Richard O'Brien – John Dee
 Adam Ant – Kid
 Helen Wellington-Lloyd – Lady-in-waiting
 Claire Davenport – First Customs Lady
 Barney James – Policeman
 Lindsay Kemp – Cabaret performer
 Gene October – Happy Days
 David Haughton – Ariel
 Siouxsie Sioux – herself
 Steven Severin – himself

Influences
The film is heavily influenced by the 1970s punk aesthetic in its style and presentation. Shot in grainy colour, it is largely plotless and episodic. Location filming took advantage of London neighbourhoods that were economically depressed and/or still contained large amounts of rubble from the London Blitz.

Reaction
The film had many critics in British punk circles. Fashion designer Vivienne Westwood manufactured a T-shirt on which was printed an "open letter" to Jarman denouncing the film and his misrepresentations of punk. Jarman, according to biographer Tony Peake, was critical of punk's fascination with fascism, while mocking its stupidity and petty violence.

Jubilee is now considered a cult classic, and was released by the Criterion Collection.

Adaptations
In November 2017, the film was adapted by Chris Goode as a play at Manchester Royal Exchange Theatre. Toyah Willcox, who played the role of Mad in the original film, performed the parts of Queen Elizabeth and Bod in this stage revival.

References

External links
 
 
 
 Julian Upton: Anarchy in the UK. Derek Jarman's 'Jubilee' revisited Bright Lights Film Journal, Issue 30, October 2000
 Jubilee an essay by Tony Peake at the Criterion Collection
Don’t Look Down . . . an essay by Tilda Swinton at the Criterion Collection

1978 films
1978 LGBT-related films
British fantasy films
Punk films
British avant-garde and experimental films
1970s avant-garde and experimental films
Films set in London
Films directed by Derek Jarman
Bisexuality-related films
Transgender-related films
1970s English-language films
1970s British films